Nils Lidman (15 February 1900 – 26 July 1976) was a Swedish weightlifter. He competed in the men's middleweight event at the 1924 Summer Olympics.

References

External links
 

1900 births
1976 deaths
Swedish male weightlifters
Olympic weightlifters of Sweden
Weightlifters at the 1924 Summer Olympics
People from Borås
Sportspeople from Västra Götaland County
20th-century Swedish people